Hajdučica (Serbian Cyrillic: Хајдучица, German: Haiduschitza) is a village in Serbia. It is situated in the Plandište municipality, in the South Banat District, Vojvodina province. The village is ethnically mixed and its population numbering 1,375 people (2002 census), including 579 Slovaks (42,10%), 419 Serbs (30,47%), 159 Hungarians (11,56%), 123 Macedonians (8,94%), and others.

Name
In Serbian the village is known as Hajdučica/Хајдучица, in Slovak as Hajdušica, in Romanian as Haiducița, in Hungarian as Istvánvölgy, and in German as Heidschütz or Heideschüte.

Historical population

1961: 1,880
1971: 1,831
1981: 1,519
1991: 1,456

Culture

There is a Hajdučica Orthodox monastery situated in the area.

See also
List of places in Serbia
List of cities, towns and villages in Vojvodina

References
Slobodan Ćurčić, Broj stanovnika Vojvodine, Novi Sad, 1996.

Populated places in Serbian Banat
Populated places in South Banat District
Plandište
Slovak communities in Serbia